House monotonicity (also called house-size monotonicity) is a property of apportionment methods and multiwinner voting systems. These are methods for allocating seats in a parliament among federal states (or among political party). The property says that, if the number of seats in the "house" (the parliament) increases, and the method is re-activated, then no state should have less seats than it previously had. A method that fails to satisfy house-monotonicity is said to have the Alabama paradox.

House monotonicity is the special case of resource monotonicity for the setting in which the resource consists of identical discrete items (the seats).

Methods violating house-monotonicity 
An example of a method violating house-monotonicity is the largest remainder method (= Hamilton's method). Consider the following instance with three states:

When one seat is added to the house, the share of state C decreases from 2 to 1.

This occurs because increasing the number of seats increases the fair share faster for the large states than for the small states. In particular, large A and B had their fair share increase faster than small C. Therefore, the fractional parts for A and B increased faster than those for C. In fact, they overtook C's fraction, causing C to lose its seat, since the method examines which states have the largest remaining fraction.

This violation is known as the Alabama paradox due to the history of its discovery. After the 1880 census, C. W. Seaton, chief clerk of the United States Census Bureau, computed apportionments for all House sizes between 275 and 350, and discovered  that Alabama would get eight seats with a House size of 299 but only seven with a House size of 300.

Simulation experiments show that monotonicity violations can be quite common. For example, in random elections, Hamilton's method has a chance of 1/18 to violate monotonicity.

Methods satisfying house-monotonicity

Methods for apportionment 
All the highest-averages methods (= divisor methods) satisfy house monotonicity. This is easy to see when considering the implementation of divisor methods as picking sequences: when a seat are added, the only change is that the picking sequence is extended with one additional pick. Therefore, all states keep their previously-picked seats. Similarly, rank-index methods, which are generalizations of divisor methods, satisfy house-monotonicity.

Moreover, capped divisor methods, which are variants of divisor methods in which a state never gets more seats than its upper quota, also satisfy house-monotonicity. An example is the Balinsky-Young quota method.

Every house-monotone method can be defined as a recursive function of the house size h. Formally, an apportionment method  is house-monotone and satisfies both quotas if-and-only-if it is constructed recursively as follows (see mathematics of apportionment for the definitions and notation):

 ; 
 If , then  is found by giving  seats to some single state , where:
 is the set of states that can get an additional seat without violating their upper quota for the new house size;
 is the set of states that might receive less than their lower quota for some future house size.
Every coherent apportionment method is house-monotone.

Methods for multiwinner voting 
Phragmen's voting rules, both for approval ballots and for ranked ballots, are house-monotone. The same is true for Thiele's addition method and Thiele's elimination method. However, Thiele's optimization method is not house-monotone.

See also 

 Resource monotonicity - a generalization of house-monotonicity to possibly different items.
 Monotonicity criterion - a different criterion, used for ranked voting systems.

References 

Apportionment method criteria
Electoral system criteria